Quercus minima, the dwarf live oak or minimal oak, is a North American species of shrubs in the beech family.  It is native to the southeastern United States. It is placed in the southern live oaks section of the genus Quercus (section Virentes).

It commonly forms extensive cloned colonies with many stems, many of them unbranched. The lobes, when present, are usually spine-tipped. The leaves are retained through the winter, dropping just before or as new growth resumes in late winter or early spring.

Quercus minima is native to the coastal plain of the southeastern United States, primarily in Florida but extending from there to the Carolinas and eastern Louisiana. There are reports of the species also growing in Texas, but these populations appear to belong to other taxa.

References

minima
Flora of the Southeastern United States
Flora of Florida
Plants described in 1860
Flora without expected TNC conservation status